The putative Wych Elm cultivar Ulmus glabra 'Latifolia' was identified in Audibert's Tonelle (1817) as U. campestris Linn. [ = U. glabra Huds.] latifolia. The tree is reputed to have originated circa 1750 in or around Mechelen, and to have been widely planted throughout Belgium. A 1912 herbarium specimen from Oudenbosch, however, shows a hybrid leaf labelled Ulmus hollandica latifolia (see 'External links').

'Latifolia' was considered "possibly the same as 'Belgica' (Belgian Elm)" by Green, though the Späth nursery of Berlin marketed Ulmus montana latifolia and Ulmus montana belgica as distinct cultivars (see 'Cultivation'). The Hesse Nursery of Weener, Germany, marketed Ulmus montana latifolia in the 1930s, as well as an Ulmus latifolia, giving Ulmus Pitteursi and Ulmus hollandica as synonyms of the latter (and listing the latter with Ulmus latifolia Dumont). Möller in Deutsche Gärtner-Zeitung (1901) gave U. scabra Mill. latifolia as a synonym of the Ulmus montana latifolia marketed in Germany, confirming it as a wych elm cultivar.

An Ulmus glabra Mill. [:smooth-leaved] var. latifolia was described by Lindley in A Synopsis of British Flora, arranged according to the Natural Order (1829), from trees near West Hatch, Epping Forest, Essex. A tree listed by that name grew in the Royal Victoria Park, Bath, in the mid-19th century.

Description
Audibert described the tree as having broader leaves than the species, which expand very early in the spring. Möller in Deutsche Gärtner-Zeitung (1901) described Ulmus montana latifolia as a tree of lush growth that forms a broad crown with large foliage. Hanham's Bath U. glabra Mill. [:smooth-leaved] latifolia (1857) had leaves "oblong, acute, and very broad".

Cultivation
No specimens are known to survive. 'Latifolia' was marketed in the late 19th century as U. montana latifolia by the Späth nursery of Berlin and by the Ulrich nursery of Warsaw, whence it was introduced to Eastern Europe. It was introduced to the Dominion Arboretum, Ottawa, Canada, probably from Späth, in 1899, as U. montana latifolia, being listed separately from U. montana belgica (planted 1896). An U. campestris latifolia appears in some early 20th C English nursery lists. An Ulmus latifolia, "compact and upright in habit" with "large leaves", appeared in the 1902 catalogue of the Bobbink and Atkins nursery, Rutherford, New Jersey. It is not known to have been introduced to Australasia.

Putative specimens
An old elm cultivar matching one of the above descriptions of 'Latifolia' and one of the herbarium specimens stands in North Merchiston Cemetery, Edinburgh (2018). The smooth leaf and shoot, asymmetrical leaf-base, 4 mm petiole, and elongated samara, suggest hybridity, despite a resemblance to wych elm.

Synonymy
 Orme de Malines: Gillekens, Éléments d'arboriculture forestière 38, 1891
 Ulmus scabra Mill. latifolia: Möller, Deutsche Gärtner-Zeitung (1901)

References

External links
  Sheet labelled Ulmus x hollandica latifolia, Oudenbosch, 1912 
  Long shoot. Sheet labelled Ulmus x hollandica latifolia, Oudenbosch, 1912 
  Sheet labelled Ulmus x hollandica latifolia

Wych elm cultivar
Ulmus articles with images
Ulmus